JS Futami (AGS-5102) was a Futami-class oceanographic research ship for the Japan Maritime Self-Defense Force.

Construction and career 
Futami was laid down on 20 January 1978 and launched on 9 August 1978 by Mitsubishi Heavy Industries Shimonoseki Shipyard. She was commissioned on 27 February 1979 and was incorporated into the Marine Service Corps and deployed in Yokosuka.

On 17 March 1980, the Marine Service Corps was reorganized into the Oceanographic Command.

She was decommissioned on 17 March 2010. During her service, her total voyage reached 579,780 nautical miles, about 28 weeks on Earth, and total voyage time of 74,809 hours.

Citations

References 
 Takao Ishibashi "All Maritime Self-Defense Force Ships 1952-2002" (Namiki Shobo, 2002).
 "World Ships Special Edition 66th Collection Maritime Self-Defense Force All Ship History" (Gaijinsha, 2004)

1978 ships
Futami-class oceanographic research ships
Ships built by Mitsubishi Heavy Industries